A list of films produced in Egypt in 1965. For an A-Z list of films currently on Wikipedia, see :Category:Egyptian films.

1965

External links
 Egyptian films of 1965 at the Internet Movie Database
 Egyptian films of 1965 at elCinema.com

Lists of Egyptian films by year
1965 in Egypt
Lists of 1965 films by country or language